Victor M. "Vic" Power is a Canadian politician who served as the longest-serving mayor of Timmins, Ontario.

Early life and education
Power graduated from Timmins High and Vocational School in 1952. He then attended the University of Windsor and the University of Toronto. He later worked as a teacher and guidance counsellor at Timmins High and Vocational School before entering municipal politics.

Political career
He was first elected to Timmins City Council as a city councillor in 1968, and served for twelve years before being elected mayor in 1980. He served as such until 1988, when he was defeated by Dennis Welin. Power returned to the mayoralty for a term later in 1991 and served continuously until 2000.

First retirement
He first announced his retirement from politics in 2000 and was succeeded as mayor by Jamie Lim.

Return as mayor
In the 2003 municipal election, however, Power challenged Lim and was re-elected mayor.

Power has also served as president of the Federation of Northern Ontario Municipalities, and as a director of Ontario Northland Transportation Commission and the Association of Municipalities of Ontario.

Power's mayoralty has been marked by ongoing efforts to diversify the city's mining-based economy. In 2004, he received national attention when he criticized the producers of Shania: A Life in Eight Albums, a television biopic of country star Shania Twain, for producing the film in Sudbury rather than Twain's actual hometown, Timmins.

Second retirement
On August 31, 2006, Power announced his second retirement from politics and that he would not be seeking the mayoralty in the 2006 elections. He was succeeded by Tom Laughren, the sole declared candidate for the mayoralty.

After politics
On May 31, 2007, the city's airport was renamed Timmins/Victor M. Power Airport in honour of the former mayor. In attendance were several councillors and politicians from across the region.

Power was named to the Order of Canada in 2009.

Personal life
Power is married to the former Clarice Dillon. They have one son, Kevin, who is a physician in Ottawa, Ontario.

References 

Mayors of Timmins
Timmins city councillors
University of Windsor alumni
University of Toronto alumni
Living people
Members of the Order of Canada
Year of birth missing (living people)